Dornier Group GmbH is an international consulting and project management company that operates in the fields of traffic, transport, the environment and water.

The German parent company was established in 1962 from the former Dornier Planungsberatung in Friedrichshafen and was formed to focus on research and development projects for public and military facilities. Through Daimler-Benz, Dornier registered in 1995 to be an independent Business Unit of DaimlerChrysler Services as a limited liability (GmbH) planning and consulting company. At this time, the mobility services of the Daimler-Benz Group was introduced. With the founding of EADS in 2000, Dornier became a 100% owned subsidiary of EADS Deutschland GmbH.

In 2009, DCo reported a revenue of 36 million euros and currently employs approximately 350 employees worldwide. Currently, they maintain more than 100 projects in 25 countries with a project volume worth approximately 30 billion euros.

They have worked on projects for the EU, various governments and authorities, the World Bank, Deutsche Bahn, Daimler, EADS and private customers as well.

The Business Units were restructured in 2007, which are now represented by the following four Business Lines:
 Transportation / Infrastructure
 Automotive
 Aerospace / Security
 Environment / Water

Subsidiaries in Germany include: PM Academy (project management training),wpm Projektmanagement GmbH  (consulting for construction project management), Dornier Consulting Engineering & Services (DCES) (supports manufacturers and suppliers in the development and quality assurance for discrete vehicle electrical systems).

External links
 Dornier Consulting

Airbus subsidiaries and divisions
1962 establishments in West Germany
Companies based in Friedrichshafen
Consulting firms established in 1962
German companies established in 1962